The Virginia House of Delegates election of 2007 was held on Tuesday, November 6.

Results

Overview

By House of Delegates district 
Party abbreviations: D - Democratic, R - Republican, I - Independent, IG - Independent Green, L - Libertarian

Note: Only House districts that were contested by more than one candidate are included here.

See also 
 2007 United States elections
 2007 Virginia elections
 2007 Virginia Senate election

References 

House of Delegates
Virginia
Virginia House of Delegates elections